Conference Finals may refer to:
 NBA Conference Finals, National Basketball Association
 NHL Conference Finals, National Hockey League
 KHL Conference Finals, Kontinental Hockey League